Rugby in England may refer to:

 Rugby Union in England
 Rugby League in England
 Rugby, England